Purington is a surname.

Notable people with the name include:
C. W. Purington, geologist who co-discovered the Purington Shale, a geological formation in Illinois
Carl Purington Rollins (1880-1960), American printer
Elisha Purington, American clockmaker, builder and first resident of the Elisha Purington House
Florence Purington (1862-1950), American academic, first dean of Mount Holyoke College
Louise.C. Purington, American physician and temperance movement leader
William Purington Cole Jr. (1889-1957), American jurist and Congressman

References

Surnames